Medway River 11 is a Mi'kmaq reserve located in Queens County, Nova Scotia.

It is administratively part of the Acadia First Nation.

Indian reserves in Nova Scotia
Communities in Queens County, Nova Scotia
Mi'kmaq in Canada